The River class was a ship class of British-designed frigates built and operated during World War II. One hundred and fifty-one frigates were built, and these were operated by seven different nations during the war.

Royal Navy

Royal Australian Navy

Royal Canadian Navy

Free French Navy

Royal Netherlands Navy

South African Navy

United States Navy

References

River Class Frigate